Isidore Bakanja (c. 1887 – 15 August 1909) was a Congolese Catholic layman who suffered martyrdom in 1909 and was beatified on 24 April 1994 by Pope John Paul II.

Life 
Bakanja accepted the Christian faith at eighteen years of age through the ministry of Cistercian missionaries in the Belgian Congo. He was a very devout convert and catechist. Bakanja had a great love for the Blessed Virgin Mary that he expressed through recitation of the rosary and by being invested in the Brown Scapular of Our Lady of Mount Carmel. His employers had ordered him to cease sharing the gospel as well as remove the scapular that he wore as a witness to his faith. Isidore's refusal to comply with the demands of his supervisor resulted in his being brutally beaten and chained.

As a result of the beating and persistent ill treatment he received, Bakanja's wounds became severely infected. As his condition worsened his supervisor sought to keep him from the view of the plantation's inspector. However, Bakanja was discovered and taken to the inspector's home for treatment. His condition had deteriorated so severely, however, that no further medical attention could help him.

Veneration 
His feast day is 15 August, on 12 August in the liturgical calendar of the Carmelite order.

The National Shrine of Saint Jude, Faversham, United Kingdom contains an icon of Isidore. In 2004 a fire broke out in the Shrine Chapel which destroyed the murals which hung there, and it damaged much of the other artwork. The decision was made to install icons depicting saints inspired by the Carmelite Rule of Saint Albert, and in commemoration of the 8th centenary of the Carmelite Rule in 2007. The icons were written by Sister Petra Clare, a Benedictine hermit living in Scotland, United Kingdom.

References 

 British Province of Carmelites
 Irondequoit Catholic Communities
 Daniel Vangroenweghe, Bakanja Isidore, Martyr Du Zaire: Recit Biographique, Didier Hatier, 1989,  / 2-87088-659-4, 
 

1887 births
Carmelite Order
Venerated Carmelites
20th-century Roman Catholic martyrs
Democratic Republic of the Congo Roman Catholics
Converts to Roman Catholicism from pagan religions
1909 deaths
Democratic Republic of the Congo beatified people
Deaths by beating
Democratic Republic of the Congo murder victims
People murdered in the Democratic Republic of the Congo
Beatifications by Pope John Paul II
1909 murders in Africa